Ragini Sonkar is an Indian physician and politician serving as a member of the 18th Legislative Assembly of Uttar Pradesh from Machhlishahr representing the Samajwadi Party. She is the daughter of politician Kailash Nath Sonkar.

Personal life
Sonkar was born to politician Kailash Nath Sonkar and hails from Varanasi in Uttar Pradesh. She did her MBBS from R. G. Kar Medical College and Hospital, Kolkata, where she worked briefly, and then completed Doctor of Medicine with specialisation in Ophthalmology from All India Institute of Medical Sciences, New Delhi.

Political career
In the 2022 Uttar Pradesh Legislative Assembly election, Sonkar represented Samajwadi Party as a candidate from Machhlishahr constituency and went on to defeat Bharatiya Janata Party's Mehilal Gautam by a margin of 8,484 votes, succeeding own party member Jagdish Sonkar in the process.

References

1990s births
Living people
All India Institute of Medical Sciences, New Delhi alumni
Samajwadi Party politicians from Uttar Pradesh
Uttar Pradesh MLAs 2022–2027
People from Jaunpur district
Year of birth missing (living people)